Plateau Preston Rex "Red" Cox (February 16, 1895 – October 15, 1984) was an American professional baseball player who pitched one season in Major League Baseball, appearing in three games for the 1920 Detroit Tigers of the American League.  In five innings pitched, he allowed three earned runs, three bases on balls, and struck out one batter.

In addition to his major league experience, he played four seasons of minor league baseball, from 1920 to 1923, the last of which was for the Birmingham Barons of the Southern Association.  He died at the age of 89 in Roanoke, Virginia,  and is interred at Mountain View Cemetery in Vinton, Virginia.

References

External links

1895 births
1984 deaths
Baseball players from North Carolina
People from Alleghany County, North Carolina
Major League Baseball pitchers
Detroit Tigers players
Hartford Senators players
Albany Senators players
Rochester Tribe players
Birmingham Barons players